Mechanicstown is a hamlet (and census-designated place) in Orange County, New York, United States. The population was 8,065 at the 2020 census. It is part of the Poughkeepsie–Newburgh–Middletown, NY Metropolitan Statistical Area as well as the larger New York–Newark–Bridgeport, NY-NJ-CT-PA Combined Statistical Area.

Mechanicstown is in the Town of Walkill, southeast of City of Middletown.

Geography
Mechanicstown is located at  (41.449568, -74.394114).

Demographics

As of the 2010 census, there were 6,858 people. The racial makeup was 47.1% white, 28.6% Hispanic, 20.9% African-American, 3.1% Asian, and 0.3% Native American.

As of the census of 2000, there were 6,061 people, 2,241 households, and 1,479 families residing in the CDP. The population density was 1,821.9 per square mile (702.8/km2). There were 2,311 housing units at an average density of 694.7/sq mi (268.0/km2). The racial makeup of the CDP was 72.41% White, 13.91% African American, 0.45% Native American, 2.85% Asian, 0.10% Pacific Islander, 6.90% from other races, and 3.38% from two or more races. Hispanic or Latino of any race were 19.88% of the population.

There were 2,241 households, out of which 33.8% had children under the age of 18 living with them, 46.0% were married couples living together, 14.2% had a female householder with no husband present, and 34.0% were non-families. 28.0% of all households were made up of individuals, and 12.2% had someone living alone who was 65 years of age or older. The average household size was 2.58 and the average family size was 3.18.

In the CDP, the population was spread out, with 24.8% under the age of 18, 9.1% from 18 to 24, 29.1% from 25 to 44, 21.5% from 45 to 64, and 15.5% who were 65 years of age or older. The median age was 37 years. For every 100 females, there were 86.6 males. For every 100 females age 18 and over, there were 81.8 males.

The median income for a household in the CDP was $45,817, and the median income for a family was $51,699. Males had a median income of $35,918 versus $28,640 for females. The per capita income for the CDP was $21,119. About 14.1% of families and 14.8% of the population were below the poverty line, including 22.7% of those under age 18 and 13.9% of those age 65 or over.

References

Census-designated places in New York (state)
Census-designated places in Orange County, New York
Hamlets in New York (state)
Poughkeepsie–Newburgh–Middletown metropolitan area
Hamlets in Orange County, New York